Jan Krob (born 27 April 1987 in Beroun) is a professional Czech football player who currently plays for Jablonec. His former clubs were among others Vlašim and Teplice. He represented his country at under-21 level.

References

External links

 
 Guardian Football

1987 births
Living people
People from Beroun
Czech footballers
Association football defenders
Czech Republic under-21 international footballers
Czech First League players
AC Sparta Prague players
SK Kladno players
SK Dynamo České Budějovice players
FC Sellier & Bellot Vlašim players
FK Teplice players
FK Jablonec players
1. FC Tatran Prešov players
Slovak Super Liga players
Expatriate footballers in Slovakia
Czech expatriate sportspeople in Slovakia
Sportspeople from the Central Bohemian Region